Borbo cinnara, commonly known as the rice swift, Formosan swift or rice leaf folder, is a butterfly belonging to the family Hesperiidae. It is found in Sri Lanka, India, Myanmar, Vietnam, Cambodia, Taiwan, and Australia.

Description

Larvae are known to feed on Setaria barbata, Axonopus compressus, Rottboellia cochinchinensis and Brachiaria mutica.

Life history

References

External links
 Australian butterflies

Hesperiinae
Butterflies of Asia
Butterflies of Sri Lanka
Butterflies of Taiwan
Butterflies of Indochina
Butterflies of Australia
Butterflies described in 1866
Taxa named by Alfred Russel Wallace